Ingo von Bredow (12 December 1939 – 4 November 2015) was a German sailor. He won the Olympic Bronze Medal  Flying Dutchman in   1960 Rome along with Rolf Mulka.

References

External links
 
 
 

1939 births
2015 deaths
German male sailors (sport)
Olympic sailors of the United Team of Germany
Sailors at the 1956 Summer Olympics – 12 m2 Sharpie
Sailors at the 1960 Summer Olympics – Flying Dutchman
Olympic bronze medalists for the United Team of Germany
Olympic medalists in sailing
Medalists at the 1960 Summer Olympics
Flying Dutchman class world champions
World champions in sailing for Germany